Speed Crazy is a 1959 American crime film directed by William J. Hole Jr. and written by Richard Bernstein and George Waters. The film stars Brett Halsey, Yvonne Lime, Charles Willcox, Trustin Howard, Jacqueline Ravell and Baynes Barron. The film was released on June 28, 1959, by Allied Artists Pictures.

Plot
Nick Burrow competes and races to the point of being trapped in an actual race.

Cast          
Brett Halsey as Nick Barrow
Yvonne Lime as Peggy Hendrix
Charles Willcox as Hap Farley
Trustin Howard as Smiley 
Jacqueline Ravell as Gina Lombardi
Baynes Barron as Ace Benton
Regina Gleason as Linda Farley
Byron Keith as Jim Brand 
Charlotte Fletcher as Dee
Jackie Joseph as Laura
Vic Marlo as Charlie Dale
Robert Swan as Tommy
Mark Sheeler as Tolliver
Troy Patterson as Leather Jacket No. 1
Robert Hinkle as Sheriff

References

External links
 
 Theatrical trailer

1959 films
American crime films
1959 crime films
Allied Artists films
American auto racing films
1950s English-language films
Films scored by Richard LaSalle
1950s American films